Sporting News began awarding a National Football League (NFL) player of the year award in 1954. From 1970 to 1979, Sporting News chose American Football Conference (AFC) and National Football Conference (NFC) players of the year, and returned to a single winner in 1980. Beginning in 2008 Sporting News chose an offensive player of the year and a defensive player of the year.

Winners

See also
National Football League Most Valuable Player Award
National Football League Offensive Player of the Year Award
National Football League Defensive Player of the Year Award
List of National Football League awards

References

National Football League trophies and awards